The Misanthrope is the debut EP from melodic death metal band Darkest Hour. It was released in 1996 on the defunct label Death Truck Records. It features a more hardcore orientated metalcore sound than their recent works.

Track listing

Personnel 
Darkest Hour
 John Henry – vocals
 Mike Schleibaum – guitars
 Raul Mayorga  – bass
 Matt Mabben – drums

Production
Howard Pyle – producer, mixing
Matt Letsinger – engineer

References 

Darkest Hour (band) EPs
1996 debut EPs